The 2011 FIVB Men's World Cup was held from 20 November to 4 December 2011 in Japan. The tournament was the first step in the qualification process for the 2012 Summer Olympics in London, England, United Kingdom. The top three teams qualified for the Olympics, and joined Great Britain as they had already secured a berth as the host country.

Qualification
12 teams participated in the World Cup:

 The host country's team. 
 The five champions of their respective continental championships in 2011. 
 Four highest-ranked second-place teams of their respective continental championships in 2011 (according to the FIVB World Ranking as of January 15, 2011). 
 NB: If Japan win or finish as one of the best runners-up in the AVC Continental Championship the third ranked team from the tournament will compete.
 Two wild cards chosen from among the participants of the continental championships in 2011.

FIVB World Ranking for second-place teams (as of January 15, 2011)

Squads

Venues

Format
The competition system of the 2011 World Cup for men was the single Round-Robin system. Each team played once against each of the 11 remaining teams. Points were accumulated during the whole tournament, and the final standing was determined by the total points gained.

The teams were divided into 2 groups of 6 teams each. 
Rounds 1 + 2 (30 matches, 5 days): Teams played against teams in the same group 
Rounds 3 + 4 (36 matches, 6 days): Teams played against teams in the other group

Pool standing procedure
 Match points
 Number of matches won
 Sets ratio
 Points ratio
 Result of the last match between the tied teams

Match won 3–0 or 3–1: 3 match points for the winner, 0 match points for the loser 
Match won 3–2: 2 match points for the winner, 1 match point for the loser

Results

|}

All times are Japan Standard Time (UTC+09:00).

First round

Site A

|}

Site B

|}

Second round

Site A

|}

Site B

|}

Third round

Site A

|}

Site B

|}

Fourth round

Site A

|}

Site B

|}

Final standing

Awards

 Most Valuable Player
  Maxim Mikhaylov
 Best Scorer
  Fernando Hernández
 Best Spiker
  Ahmed Abdelhay
 Best Blocker
  Marcin Możdżonek

 Best Server
  Cristian Savani
 Best Setter
  Luciano De Cecco
 Best Receiver
  Sérgio Santos
 Best Libero
  Ren Qi

References

External links
 Official website
 Awards

2011 Men
World Cup Men
World Cup Men
2011 FIVB Men's World Cup